Daniel Taylor (born February 12, 1955) is a Canadian hyperrealist painter,  known for his realist portraits and wildlife art.

Taylor’s work has been prominently displayed in countries such as Canada, Japan, United States, England, and Australia. A permanent exhibition of his art is on display in the John F. Kennedy Center for Performing Arts in Washington, D.C.

Originally, Taylor sketched and painted portraits and landscapes in oil but later turned to acrylic and wildlife. Later, he worked to fuse these themes together.

Taylor was granted the Federal and Provincial Ambassadorship of the VSA Arts for assisting in the creation of art workshops for both children and adults with disabilities. He has also been selected to assist celebrities by donating his work towards the Leukaemia and Diabetes Societies.

One of Taylor's projects, ArtSavingWildlife was designed to fund the conservation of endangered wildlife species in Africa.

Daniel Taylor's artwork has been featured in art publications including Wildlife Art Magazine, Western & Wildlife Art Magazine, International Artist Magazine, and Wildscape Magazine.

See also
List of wildlife artists

References

External links
African Conservation Foundation
VSA Arts
Canadian Federation of Artists
UN Year of the Gorilla 2009
Art In Canada

1955 births
Living people
20th-century Canadian painters
Canadian male painters
21st-century Canadian painters
Animal artists
Artists from Vancouver
20th-century Canadian male artists
21st-century Canadian male artists